Assisi Covent Inter College (also known as Assisi Convent School) is a coeducational private school in Baheri. It was founded in 1993 with the arrival of the Sisters of Ursulines of St. Francis. It is the only school in the town affiliated to Council for the Indian School Certificate Examinations. The school is also engaged in conducting non formal education to the children and adults in the villages.

Ursuline schools
Catholic secondary schools in India
Primary schools in Uttar Pradesh
High schools and secondary schools in Uttar Pradesh
Intermediate colleges in Uttar Pradesh
Christian schools in Uttar Pradesh
Bareilly district
Educational institutions established in 1993
1993 establishments in Uttar Pradesh